The Ozanne is a 46.0 km long French river, a tributary of the Loir, which is a tributary of the Loire.

Geography 
The river spring is located at Perche-Gouët, Béthonvilliers at 222 m high at le Burail locality in le Bois de Beaumont.

2 offshoots: la Suzanne ou Sainte-Suzanne et l'Ozanne de Dampierre ou Moranne ou Mozanne which join near Brou.

It flows into le Loir, right bank, 1 km north of Bonneval at 129 m high at Ouzenain (locality).

Tributaries 
The Ozanne has 7 official affluents (14 including sub-affluents) :
 ?(source secondaire), (rg), 3 km, sur les deux communes de Vicheres et Beaumont-les-Autels.
 ?, (rg), 0.9 km, sur les deux communes de Miermaigne et Beaumont-les-Autels.
 sept bras de l'Ozanne, pour un total de 8.3 km sur les six communes de Unverre, Brou, Yèvres, Dangeau, Moulhard et Luigny.
 le Sainte Suzanne, (rd), 19.2 km sur les cinq communes de Unverre, Authon-du-Perche, Charbonnières, Beaumont-les-Autels et Les Autels-Villevillon avec deux affluents :
 ?, 4 km ?un bras? sur Unverre.
 la Sonnette, (rd), 13.5 km sur les cinq communes de Unverre, Charbonnières, Soize, La Bazoche-Gouet, Les Autels-Villevillon.
 la Vallée d'Esse, (rd), 10.1 km sur les deux communes de Unverre et Yèvres.
 la Vallée de Tronchet, (rd), 8.8 km sur la seule commune de Yèvres.
 la vallée de Montparentière, (rg), 3.1 km sur la seule commune de Yèvres.
 la vallée des Vollars, (rd), 6.3 km sur les trois communes de Yèvres, Dangeau, Gohory.

Strahler number of 3

Watershed 
The hydrological area of the Ozanne and its affluents is 278 km² wide, which is composed of farming land (91.52%), of forests and semi-natural areas (6.55%), artificial areas (1.76%) and damp areas (0.12%).

Hydrology 
The Ozanne debit was studied from 1973 to 2014 at Prémoteux, near Trizay-lès-Bonneval at 126 m high, very close to its meeting point with the Loir. The river watershed is of 268 km² (96% of the 278 km²).

The river module at Trizay-lès-Bonneval is of 1.46 m³/s.

The river presents impotent seasonal debital fluctuations, with high waters in Winter: mean monthly debit of 2,71 and 3.61 m³/s, from December to March (peak in January) and low waters in Summer, end of May to beginning of October, with a mean monthly debit drop of up to 0.235 m³ in August (235 L/s).

Low waters 
However, the 3-day low-water volume can drop to a severe 0.044 m³ during a dry five-year period (or 44 L/s).

Floods 
Floods can also be important.

The maximal debit recorded was 65.2 m³/s on January 22, 1995, while the maximal daily worth was of 52.6 m³/s on April 10, 1983, which is expected to happen every 10 to 15 years on average. The maximal height was of 1920 mm (or 1.92 m) on January 14, 2004.

Water slide and debit 
The yearly precipitation in the Ozanne basin is of a modest 173 mm, far below the national average, but also to that of la Loire (244 mm yearly), closer to its neighboring river Yerre (176 mm), with an average debit of 5.5 L/s and km².

Mill localities 
Géoportail records 11 "mill" localities : le moulin de Vinet, le moulin de l'Orme, le moulin Foulon, le moulin Vieux et un gué, le moulin Brière, le moulin de Forçonnerie, le moulin d'Epasses, le moulin de Georges, le moulin de la Varenne, le moulin de Patry, un gué, le moulin de Frécot.

ZNIEFF 
The river Ozanne marks the northern limit of a little ZNIEFF Chenaie-charmaie de la Poupelière.

References 

Rivers of France
Rivers of Centre-Val de Loire
Rivers of Eure-et-Loir